Gonbad Bahram (also Romanized as Gonbad Bahrām and Gonbad-e Bahrām) is a village in Gevar Rural District, Sarduiyeh District, Jiroft County, Kerman Province, Iran. At the 2006 census, its population was 15, in 4 families.

References 

Populated places in Jiroft County